Eric Holmes is a Scottish writer, creative director and video game designer. He is a graduate of the University of Edinburgh and has worked for DICE since February 2015. He has also worked in comics, being the writer of IDW Publishing's miniseries The Transformers: Megatron Origin.

Works
 Earthworm Jim 3D (31 October 1999)
 State of Emergency (12 February 2002)
 Hulk (27 May 2003)
 The Incredible Hulk: Ultimate Destruction (23 August 2005)
 Prototype (9 June 2009)
 Infinity Blade (9 December 2010)
 Gears of War 3 (20 September 2011)
 Fortnite (25 July 2017)
 Batman: Arkham Origins (25 October 2013)
 Battlefield 1 (21 October 2016)
 Battlefield V (20 November 2018)
 Battlefield 2042 (19 November 2021)

Past

 VIS Entertainment (Game designer), 1997–1999
 Probe Entertainment (Game designer), 1999–2000
 EA Canada (Game designer), 2000 – October 2001
 Radical Entertainment (Lead designer), October 2001 – April 2009
 Epic Games (Lead designer), July 2009 – October 2011
 WB Games Montréal (Creative director), October 2011 – February 2015
 EA DICE, February 2015 – present

References

Related links
 Eric Holmes Personal Site at www.videogamedesign.net
 Eric Holmes at Mobygames
 

Year of birth missing (living people)
Living people
British video game designers
British comics writers
Canadian video game designers
Canadian comics writers
Writers from Vancouver
Scottish emigrants to Canada